Rev. William Bantom (born 1946?) was mayor of Cape Town from 1995 to 2000.

He became the city's first black mayor following the first non-racial local government elections in 1995.  He was forced to resign as mayor and expelled from the New National Party in 2000 after being caught downloading pornography from the internet.

He was a minister in the Church of the Nazarene.

References

Mayors of Cape Town
Living people
1940s births
Church of the Nazarene ministers
South African members of the Church of the Nazarene
National Party (South Africa) politicians